Mallaj is situated at Majhphant VDC of western Nepal. It has high potential for tourism. Here the resort the name of Heritage of Mallaj. It is famous for pathway from Beni to Mallaj, way of Nangi, Banskharka, Dhairing, and Salija.

Mallaj has many historical places such as Purnagaun Baraha Mandir, Siwalaya Mandir, Gufa Mandir. It is touched VDC with Banskharka VDC which is famous for orange farms.

References

External links
UN map of the municipalities of Parbat District

Populated places in Parbat District